Ti'ho is a Mayan settlement located in the northwest of the Yucatán Peninsula, commonly indicated also with the alternative name of T'hó (in short), Ichcansiho, Ichkanzihóo or Ichcaanzihó.

Mérida, the capital of the Yucatan state in Mexico and its largest city, was built on the ruins of this Mayan settlement and founded in 1542 by Francisco de Montejo.

References 

Maya civilization
Mérida, Yucatán